The Young railway station  is a heritage-listed former railway station at located on the Blayney-Harden railway line, in Young, Hilltops Council, New South Wales, Australia. It is also known as Young Railway Station and yard group. The railway station and associated yards were added to the New South Wales State Heritage Register on 2 April 1999.

The station was opened on 26 March 1885 and was used for regional rail passenger transport up until its closure as a railway station on 15 December 1989; and is now used as a visitor centre. The Blayney-Harden railway line is now used solely for bulk haulage of grain.

History 
During the construction of the southern and western railway lines in New South Wales in 1875 a line connecting the two was proposed. The line opened in March 1885. The station opened on March 26, 1885 and closed on December 15, 1989. Repairs were done on the station building in 2007.

Description 
There is a station building (type 5, first class brick) built in 1885. The platform face is made of stone. There is landscaping of the station forecourt adjoining Council park area.

Heritage listing 
Young station complex represents a major first class Victorian terminus station on a single line with significant contribution to the townscape. Its steep gable roofs, symmetry and Gothic inspiration make it an architecturally interesting and unique station building. The building form is of a major civic building of local importance, situated on a rise overlooking the town and adjacent to Anderson Park, a large park with mature plantings of deciduous trees. The vista both to and from the building forms an integral part of the townscape and is included in the heritage listing.

The complex represents the importance of early railway construction to the local community by the scale of the building and the grandeur of the vision of railway expansion that was in full flight in the 1880s. The former gatekeepers cottage (now sold), located opposite the station, is in its original form which is contiguous with the station building and enhances the station and environs. The overbridges are good examples of timber structures that once prevalent are now increasingly rare. They were extensively used throughout the State for both major and minor crossings of railway lines.

Young railway station was listed on the New South Wales State Heritage Register on 2 April 1999 having satisfied the following criteria.

The place possesses uncommon, rare or endangered aspects of the cultural or natural history of New South Wales.

This item is assessed as historically rare. This item is assessed as architecturally rare. This item is assessed as socially rare.

See also 

 Regional railway stations in New South Wales

References

Attribution

Further reading

External links 

 
 

New South Wales State Heritage Register
Young, New South Wales
Regional railway stations in New South Wales
Articles incorporating text from the New South Wales State Heritage Register
Railway stations in Australia opened in 1885
Disused regional railway stations in New South Wales
Railway stations closed in 1989
Blayney–Demondrille railway line